Jesús León Santos is a Mexican environmentalist. He was awarded the Goldman Environmental Prize in 2008, for his efforts on a sustainable development of agriculture in the Mixtec region of the state of Oaxaca.

References 

Year of birth missing (living people)
Living people
People from Oaxaca
Mexican environmentalists
Goldman Environmental Prize awardees